is a Japan-exclusive Sega Mega Drive professional wrestling video game. This is the only game in the Fire Pro Wrestling series to be released for that system.

The game features an "Exciting" mode that allows players to take on each other, an elimination mode where ten chosen wrestlers compete to win, and a handicap mode where one wrestler must take on two opponents.

A North American release under by name, Jesse "The Body" Ventura Wrestling Superstars, was planned by DreamWorks, but was never released for unknown reasons. A ROM for the cancelled English version has since leaked online.

See also

References

1992 video games
Fire Pro Wrestling
Human Entertainment games
Japan-exclusive video games
Sega Genesis games
Sega Genesis-only games
Professional wrestling games
Multiplayer and single-player video games
Video games developed in Japan